Area codes 317 and 463 are North American Numbering Plan area codes for Indianapolis and nine surrounding counties in central Indiana. It covers all or part of Marion, Boone, Hancock, Hamilton, Hendricks, Johnson, Madison, Morgan, and Shelby counties. 317 is the original area code, while 463 is an overlay covering the same area, making ten-digit dialing mandatory for all calls in the region.

History
In 1947, American Telephone and Telegraph (AT&T) published the first configuration of proposed numbering plan areas (NPAs) for a new nationwide numbering and toll call routing system. Indiana was divided to receive two area codes. Area code 317 served the northern two-thirds of Indiana, while area code 812 served the southern third. In the first change of the original plan in 1948, 317 was cut back to central Indiana, while the northern third of Indiana, including Gary, Hammond, East Chicago, South Bend, Elkhart and Fort Wayne, received area code 219.

Despite Indianapolis's rapid growth during the second half of the 20th century, and the accompanying increased number demand, this configuration remained in place for 48 years. No changes were made to 317 until February 1, 1997, when most of the old 317 territory outside of the inner ring of the Indianapolis metropolitan area switched to 765.

The proliferation of pagers and cell phones depleted the numbering resources of area code 317, so that it was expected to exhaust in 2017. The Indiana Regulatory Commission announced that area code 463 would be added in 2016 to form an overlay numbering plan. The new area code, which spells out IND on a standard telephone keypad, made 317 the second Indiana area code to be overlaid after area code 812 was overlaid with 930 in March 2015.

Area code 463 entered service on March 15, 2016. On that date, a permissive dialing period began during which both seven- and ten-digit calls would be able to complete. Ten-digit dialing was originally to become mandatory in the Indianapolis area on September 15, 2016. However, on August 31, in response to an appeal from security alarm companies, the deadline was extended to October 15, 2016.

See also
List of NANP area codes

References

External links

List of exchanges from AreaCodeDownload.com, 317 Area Code

317
317
Indianapolis
Boone County, Indiana
Hamilton County, Indiana
Hancock County, Indiana
Hendricks County, Indiana
Henry County, Indiana
Johnson County, Indiana
Madison County, Indiana
Marion County, Indiana
Morgan County, Indiana
Shelby County, Indiana
Telecommunications-related introductions in 1947
Indianapolis metropolitan area
Telecommunications-related introductions in 2016